Bab'Aziz:  (English: Bab'Aziz: The prince who contemplated his soul), often abbreviated to Bab'Aziz, is a 2005 film by Tunisian writer and director Nacer Khemir. It stars Parviz Shahinkhou, Maryam Hamid, Hossein Panahi, Nessim Khaloul, Mohamed Graïaa, Maryam Mohaid and Golshifteh Farahani. It was filmed in Iran and Tunisia.

Summary and themes

The film's complex and nonlinear narrative chiefly centers around the journey of a blind dervish, Bab'Aziz (Parviz Shahinkhou), and his granddaughter, Ishtar (Maryam Hamid), who — while traveling across the desert towards an immense Sufi gathering — encounter several strangers who relate the stories of their own mysterious and spiritual quests.

Bab'Aziz is the third part of Khemir's "Desert Trilogy", which also comprises his 1984  (Wanderers of the desert) and 1991  (The dove's lost necklace). The three films share structural elements and themes drawn from Islamic mysticism and classical culture, as well as an isolated desert setting. Khemir has said:

Bab'Aziz is particularly concerned with Sufi themes. Khemir has stated that he wished to show, in the film, "an open, tolerant and friendly Islamic culture, full of love and wisdom . . . an Islam that is different from the one depicted by the media in the aftermath of 9/11", and that the unusual structure of the film was a deliberate attempt to imitate the structure of Iranian Sufi visions and dances, aimed at allowing the spectator to "forget about his own ego and to put it aside in order to open up to the reality of the world".

Cast

 Parviz Shahinkhou as Bab'Aziz
 Maryam Hamid as Ishtar
 Hossein Panahi as red dervish
 Nessim Khaloul as Zaid
 Mohamed Graïaa as Osman
 Golshifteh Farahani as Nour
 Soren Mehrabiar as dervish

Reception

Box office
Bab'Aziz has grossed $263,447 worldwide.

Critical response

Bab'Aziz received mixed reviews from critics. Review aggregator Rotten Tomatoes reports that 58% of 24 critics have given the film a positive review. Boston Globe critic Michael Hardy found fault with Khemir's "well-meaning attempt to correct Western misconceptions of Islam", complaining that the film "is set in the present, but resolutely ignores current events in favor of pervasive nostalgia for the glorious past". However, Matt Zoller Seitz of The New York Times praised it as "a structurally audacious fairy tale that imparts moral lessons and shows how narratives reflect and shape life". According to The Hollywood reporter reviewer Frank Scheck " What 'Bab' Aziz' lacks in narrative clarity it makes up for in visual and musical splendor, and the fact that its co-screenwriter is Tonino Guerra". He added that the movie is better experienced on a big screen.

Bibliography
 Firoozeh Papan-Matin. "Nacer Khemir and the Subject of Beauty in Bab'Aziz: The Prince Who Contemplated His Soul," Cinema Journal. Fall 2012, 52:1, 52:1, pp. 107–26.
 Bab'Aziz - Nacer Khemir (2005), The Film Sufi, 06/12/201
 Bab'Aziz, Plume-noire, Damien Panerai , Access date: 27 May 2022

References

External links
 Bab'Aziz: The Prince Who Contemplated His Soul | Typecast Films
 

Tunisian drama films
Films about Islam
Sufi art
2005 films
Iranian multilingual films
Iranian drama films
Tunisian multilingual films